Exoprosopini is a tribe of bee flies in the family Bombyliidae. There are more than 20 genera and 760 described species in Exoprosopini.

Genera

 Atrichochira Hesse, 1956
 Balaana Lambkin & Yeates, 2003
 Collosoptera Hull, 1973
 Defilippia Lioy, 1864
 Diatropomma Bowden, 1962
 Euligyra Lambkin, 2003
 Exoprosopa Macquart, 1840
 Heteralonia Rondani, 1863
 Hyperalonia Rondani, 1864
 Kapu Lambkin & Yeates, 2006
 Larrpana Lambkin & Yeates, 2003
 Ligyra Newman, 1841
 Litorhina Bowden, 1975
 Micomitra Bowden, 1964
 Munjua Lambkin & Yeates, 2003
 Muwarna Lambkin & Yeates, 2003
 Ngalki Lambkin, 2011
 Nyia Márquez-Acero et al., 2020
 Palirika Lambkin & Yeates, 2003
 Pseudopenthes Roberts, 1928
 Pterobates Bezzi, 1924
 Wurda Lambkin & Yeates, 2003

References

Bombyliidae
Brachycera tribes